The Low Lows is the third album by Parker and Lily. It was released on January 25, 2005  via the label, Warm Records, now known as Warm Electronic Recordings.

Track listing

"Low Lows" - 5:08   
"I Am a Gun" - 4:58  
"June Gloom" - 5:47 
"User's Guide" - 3:02 
"Last Goodnight" - 5:02  
"Suit of Fire" - 2:34   
"Invisible Cities" - 3:06  
"Candy's Last Day" - 5:11 
"Smashing Party" - 3:51

References

External links 
 Warm Electronic Recordings

2001 albums
Parker and Lily albums